Helder Zahluth Barbalho (born 18 May 1979) is a Brazilian administrator, politician, the current governor of the state of Pará, former Chief Minister of National Secretariat of Ports and Minister of Fishing and Aquaculture during the government of president Dilma Rousseff, and former Minister of National Integration, appointed by president Michel Temer.

He is the son of former governor of Pará and current senator Jader Barbalho and federal congresswoman Elcione Zahluth Barbalho, has a bachelor's degree in administration by Universidade da Amazônia (UNAMA) and an executive MBA in public administration from Fundação Getulio Vargas

As the son of Pará's former governor Jader Barbalho, Helder Barbalho started his political career while young, at the age of 18 he joined the Brazilian Democratic Movement, in 2000, he became the most voted city councilman in the city of Ananindeua, and in 2002 was elected State deputy in the legislature of Pará, once again as the most voted candidate in the state's history, he left the position in 2004 to become mayor of the city of Ananindeua in 2005, a position that he held until 2012.

In 2014, Barbalho participated in the elections to become governor of Pará but was defeated by then governor Simão Jatene, he joined the federal government as Minister of Fishing and Aquaculture in 2015 and later became Minister of National Integration until he left in 2018 to dispute and win the 2018 elections for the state of Pará becoming governor from 2019 on.

Biography 
Helder Barbalho was born in Belém, capital of the brazilian state of Pará, son of politicians Jader Barbalho and Elcione Zahluth Barbalho, both members of the Brazilian Democratic Movement. He went through basic education in Colégio Pequeno Princípe, Escola Tenente Rego Barros, both in Belém, and on Colégio Marista, in Brasília. Back on his hometown, Helder went through high school on Escola Tenente Rego Barros and Colégio Moderno.

In 2002, he attained a bachelor's degree in administration by Universidade da Amazônia (UNAMA) and right after, obtained the executive MBA in public administration by Fundação Getulio Vargas (FGV) on the city of São Paulo.

He is married with Daniela Lima Barbalho, who is also the mother of his three children: Helder Filho, Thor, and Heva.

Notes
 E. Charge fused with Ministry of Agriculture, Livestock and Supply.

References

|-

|-

|-

|-

1979 births
Living people
Brazilian Democratic Movement politicians
Government ministers of Brazil
Governors of Pará
People from Belém
21st-century Brazilian politicians